The Moscow Central Diameters (MCD) are a system of city train services on existing commuter rail lines in Moscow and Moscow Oblast, Russia.

The system began operation on 21 November 2019, when the first two lines were launched. After first 9.5 months of operation, the passenger traffic of the Moscow Central Diameters reached 100 million. On 27 December 2019, passengers made record 554.6 thousand trips.

Lines
Line D3 is planned to be launched in August 2023. D4 will be launched in September. The schedule for the development of the infrastructure of the Central Transport Hub in 2023 was signed by Moscow Mayor Sergei Sobyanin and head of Russian Railways Oleg Belozerov in December 2022.

Ticket prices

The trip cost depends on travel distance; transfers to and from the Moscow Metro and the MCC are free.

At MCD-1 and MCD-2 there are three tariff zones:
 "Central" (within the boundaries of the stations MarkSetun, VolokolamskayaOstafyevo). The cost for the Troika card is 40 rubles. You can also use a ticket for 60 trips, tickets for the number of days recorded on the Troika, and a credit card. All prices are the same as in Moscow Metro.
 "Suburb" (for trips through the territory of the Moscow region and to Moscow within the MCD). A one-time trip at the "Wallet" tariff costs 45 rubles, a ticket for 90 minutes costs 83 rubles. 
 "Far" (for trips from stations outside the MCD). The price is made up of 23 rubles for each zone of suburban trains to the borders of the MCD and 45 rubles of the MCD "Wallet" tariff or 83 rubles at the 90-minute tariff.

Gallery

See also 
 Réseau Express Régional
 Crossrail
 S-train

References

External links
WDC information by Москва City Website

Moscow Railway
Railway lines opened in 2019
2019 establishments in Russia
Railway lines in Russia